Eulogia Echaurren García-Huidobro (1830– April 27, 1887) was First Lady of Chile and the wife of President Federico Errázuriz Zañartu.

She was born in Santiago, the daughter of José Gregorio de Echaurren y Herrera and of Juana García-Huidobro y Aldunate. She was also the mother of President Federico Errázuriz Echaurren and of María Errázuriz Echaurren, the First Lady of Chile from 1901 to 1906.

See also
First Lady of Chile

External links
Genealogical chart of Echaurren family 

1830 births
1887 deaths
Chilean people of Basque descent
People from Santiago
First ladies of Chile

19th-century Chilean people